Plantain may refer to:

Plants and fruits 
 Cooking banana, banana cultivars in the genus Musa whose fruits are generally used in cooking
 True plantains, a group of cultivars of the genus Musa
 Plantaginaceae, a family of flowering plants known as plantains
 Plantago, a genus of Plantaginaceae
 Platanus, a genus of trees formerly known as plantains

Other uses 
 Plantain Garden River, in Jamaica
 Plantain River, a tributary of the Gulf of Saint Lawrence in L'Île-d'Anticosti, Quebec, Canada
 James Plaintain (fl. 1720–1728), a pirate active in the Indian Ocean
Plantain mosa, a Nigerian snack which is a component of small chops

See also 
 Banana (disambiguation)
 Fried plantain, a dish made from plantains
 List of banana cultivars
 Hosta, or plantain lily